Palmistry is the practice of fortune-telling through the study of the palm. Also known as palm reading, chiromancy, chirology or cheirology, the practice is found all over the world, with numerous cultural variations. Those who practice palmistry are generally called palmists, hand readers, hand analysts, or chirologists.

There are many—and often conflicting—interpretations of various lines and palmar features across various teachings of palmistry. Palmistry is practiced by the Hindus and is still practiced in South India widely as an hereditary job by several castes such as Kuravan from Kerala, and is also indirectly referenced in the Book of Job. The practice is widely viewed as a pseudoscience due to various contradictions between different interpretations and the lack of evidence for palmistry's predictions.

History

Ancient palmistry
Palmistry is a practice common to many different places on the Eurasian landmass; it has been practiced in the cultures of Sumeria, Babylonia, Arabia, Canaan, Persia, India, Nepal, Tibet and China.

The acupuncturist Yoshiaki Omura describes its roots in Hindu astrology (known in Sanskrit as jyotish), Chinese Yijing (I Ching), and Roma fortune tellers. Several thousand years ago, the Hindu sage Valmiki is thought to have written a book comprising 567 stanzas, the title of which translates in English as The Teachings of Valmiki Maharishi on Male Palmistry. From India, the art of palmistry spread to China, Tibet and to other countries in Europe.

Palmistry also progressed independently in Greece where Anaxagoras practiced it. Aristotle (384–322 B.C.E.) reportedly discovered a treatise on the subject of palmistry on an altar of Hermes, which he then presented to Alexander the Great (356–323 B.C.E.), who took great interest in examining the character of his officers by analyzing the lines on their hands. A chapter of a 17th-century sex manual, misattributed to Aristotle, is occasionally incorrectly cited as being the treatise in question. The text it is not contained in his canonical works.

Palmistry is indirectly referenced in the Book of Job, which is dated by scholars to between the 7th and 4th centuries BCE.

In Renaissance magic, palmistry (known as "chiromancy") was classified as one of the seven "forbidden arts", along with necromancy, geomancy, aeromancy, pyromancy, hydromancy, and spatulamancy (scapulimancy). During the 16th century the art of palmistry was actively suppressed by the Catholic Church. Both Pope Paul IV and Pope Sixtus V issued papal edicts against various forms of divination, including palmistry.

Modern palmistry
Palmistry experienced a revival in the modern era starting with Captain Casimir Stanislas D'Arpentigny's publication La Chirognomie in 1839.

The Chirological Society of Great Britain was founded in London by Katharine St. Hill in 1889 with the stated aim to advance and systematise the art of palmistry and to prevent charlatans from abusing the art. Edgar de Valcourt-Vermont (Comte C. de Saint-Germain) founded the American Chirological Society in 1897.

A pivotal figure in the modern palmistry movement was the Irish William John Warner, known by his sobriquet, Cheiro. After studying under gurus in India, he set up a palmistry practice in London and enjoyed a wide following of famous clients from around the world, including famous celebrities like Mark Twain, W. T. Stead, Sarah Bernhardt, Mata Hari, Oscar Wilde, Grover Cleveland, Thomas Edison, the Prince of Wales, General Kitchener, William Ewart Gladstone, and Joseph Chamberlain. So popular was Cheiro as a "society palmist" that even those who were not believers in the occult had their hands read by him. The skeptical Mark Twain wrote in Cheiro's visitor's book that he had "exposed my character to me with humiliating accuracy".

Edward Heron-Allen, an English polymath, published various works including the 1883 book, Palmistry: A Manual of Cheirosophy, which is still in print. There were attempts at formulating some sort of scientific basis for the art, most notably in the 1900 publication The Laws of Scientific Hand Reading by William Gurney Benham.

In 1970, Parker Brothers published a game designed by Maxine Lucille Fiel called "Touch-Game of Palmistry" which allowed players have "palm reading and analysis" through selecting cards that matched designated palm features.

Criticism
Criticism of palmistry often rests with the lack of empirical evidence supporting its efficacy. Scientific literature typically regards palmistry as a pseudoscientific or superstitious belief. Psychologist and noted skeptic Ray Hyman has written:

I started reading palms in my teens as a way to supplement my income from doing magic and mental shows. When I started I did not believe in palmistry. But I knew that to "sell" it I had to act as if I did. After a few years I became a firm believer in palmistry. One day the late Stanley Jaks, who was a professional mentalist and a man I respected, tactfully suggested that it would make an interesting experiment if I deliberately gave readings opposite to what the lines indicated. I tried this out with a few clients. To my surprise and horror my readings were just as successful as ever. Ever since then I have been interested in the powerful forces that convince us, reader and client alike, that something is so when it really isn't.

Skeptics often include palmists on lists of alleged psychics who practice cold reading. Cold reading is the practice that allows readers of all kinds, including palmists, to appear psychic by using high-probability guessing and inferring details based on signals or cues from the other person.

Although some Christians condemn palmistry as a form of divination, Jewish and Christian traditions are largely ambivalent about divination in general. While some specific practices such as necromancy and astrology are condemned by biblical authors, other practices such as dream interpretation, casting of lots, and the use of Urim and Thummim are not. During the 16th century the Catholic Church condemned the practice of palmistry. However, there is a long tradition of practicing palmistry within both Jewish and Christian mysticism, and some practitioners, such as Comte C. de Saint-Germain, have argued that the Bible does not oppose it.

However, Islam strongly condemns divination in all forms and considers palmistry haram (forbidden). The Quran states that "You are also forbidden to seek knowledge of your fate by divining arrows." Those that practice such divination are explicitly called "angels".

See also
List of topics characterized as pseudoscience
Alectryomancy
Chironomia
Digit ratio
Graphology
Guidonian hand
Onychomancy
Phrenology
Physiognomy
Reflexology
Single transverse palmar crease
Tarot

References

Further reading
 Beamish, Richard. The psychonomy of the hand: or, The hand an index of mental development according to Mm. d'Arpentigny and Desbarrolles
 
 
 
 de Saint-Germain, Comte C. (1897). Practical Palmistry. Chicago: Laird & Lee Publishers.
 
 
 
 
 van Dijk-Rijneke, Magda. Universal Hand Analysis, 2017 Elmar Publishers

External links

 Palmistry - Skeptic's Dictionary

Divination
Hand
Pseudoscience
Romani culture